From List of National Natural Landmarks, these are the National Natural Landmarks in Vermont.  There are 12 in total.

Vermont
Vermont geography-related lists